Alec Michael Torelli (born March 24, 1987) also known by his moniker Traheho, is a professional poker player from Orange County, California who specializes in live high stakes cash games. Torelli was formerly sponsored by Doyles Room.

Poker career 
Torelli began playing poker in 2004 after a friend invited him to a home game of poker where he won $12. His first live poker event was in the Bahamas in January 2006. After turning 21, Torelli moved to Las Vegas. During his first World Series of Poker (WSOP), he finished 2nd in the $10,000 Heads Up event. Later that fall, he won back-to-back events at the Bellagio. The next summer, he placed 6th in the commemorative $40,000, 40-year anniversary WSOP event, and 4th in the World Poker Tour at the Bellagio.

In May 2017, during a televised episode of Poker Night in America Torelli had larger denomination chips totaling $10,000 placed behind smaller denomination chips in his stack of poker chips. Poker rules require that larger denomination chips have to be in plain view. This influenced Torelli's isolated opponent in the hand, Daniel Wolf, who ended up losing $10,000 more than he believed was at stake.[6] Poker player, Doug Polk, released a video questioning the ethics of the hand played during the episode.[7][8]

As of 2018, Torelli has amassed over $1,500,000 of poker tournament winnings.

References

External links
 
 Alec Torelli Hendon Mob profile

American poker players
Living people
1987 births